Bradley Kent Garlinghouse (born February 4, 1971) is the CEO of financial technology company Ripple Labs. He previously was the CEO and chairman of Hightail (formerly YouSendIt). Before Hightail, he worked at AOL and Yahoo!

He was born February 6, 1971, in Topeka, Kansas. Garlinghouse has a BA in economics from the University of Kansas and an MBA from Harvard Business School. The whitewashing of unflattering details from this Wikipedia page was a subject of discussion by Financial Times in August 2020.

Career 
Garlinghouse had early stints at @Home Network and as a GP at @Ventures before joining Dialpad as CEO from 2000 to 2001. From 2003 to 2008, he served as Senior Vice President at Yahoo! where he ran its Homepage, Flickr, Yahoo! Mail, and Yahoo! Messenger divisions. While at Yahoo! he penned an internal memo known as the "Peanut Butter Manifesto," calling for the company to focus on its core business, rather than spreading itself too thin, like peanut butter.

After Yahoo!, he served as a Senior Advisor at Silver Lake Partners, and then went on to be President of Consumer Applications at AOL from 2009 to 2011. He joined Hightail and served as its CEO until September 2014, leaving after a disagreement with the board regarding company direction.

Garlinghouse previously held board positions at Animoto.

Garlinghouse joined Ripple as COO in April 2015, reporting to then CEO and co-founder Chris Larsen. He was promoted to CEO in December 2016.

In December 2019, Garlinghouse announced that Ripple had raised a $200M series C funding round from Tetragon, SBI Ventures and Route 66 Ventures. In 2020 Garlinghouse admitted that Ripple Labs would be losing money if it did not have the revenue generated from the sales of the XRP cryptocurrency.

In 2018 and 2019, Garlinghouse claimed on multiple occasions that the published error rate for SWIFT messaging was at least 6%. This was shown to be untrue by research published by the London School of Economics Business Review that showed Garlinghouse's claims were based on mis-reading of a paper published by SWIFT that did not refer to error rates in messaging.

Garlinghouse has been personally named in a group of class actions, notably Zakinov v. Ripple Labs Inc. (case number 18-6753), running since 2018 that claim Garlinghouse and his employers, Ripple Labs Inc. have been in breach of various California and Federal securities laws. He was also a party to Bitcoin Manipulation Abatement LLC v. Ripple Labs Inc., which was administratively closed with reference to case 18-6753 previously mentioned.

On December 23, 2020, the U.S. Securities and Exchange Commission (SEC) issued a complaint alleging that Garlinghouse, Ripple Labs and Ripple Chairman Chris Larsen had committed multiple breaches of securities laws.

He uses bots and account hacking to promote his events in Twitter.

References

External links
 Brad Garlinghouse - AOL Corp
 Garlinghouse new CEO of YouSendIt
Why Brad Garlinghouse left Hightail

1972 births
American chief executives
American chief operating officers
Angel investors
Harvard Business School alumni
Living people
People from Atherton, California
People from Menlo Park, California
People from Topeka, Kansas
University of Kansas alumni
People associated with cryptocurrency
21st-century American businesspeople